Gabriel Harvey (c. 1552/3 – 1631) was an English writer. Harvey was a notable scholar, whose reputation suffered from his quarrel with Thomas Nashe. Henry Morley, writing in the Fortnightly Review (March 1869), has argued that Harvey's Latin works demonstrate that he was distinguished by qualities very different from the pedantry and conceit usually associated with his name.

Family
Gabriel Harvey was the eldest son of John Harvey (d.1593), a yeoman farmer and master ropemaker from Saffron Walden, Essex, and his wife, Alice (d.1613). He had two younger brothers, Richard and John (d. July 1592), and a sister, Mercy.

Education
Harvey received his early education at the town's grammar school, and matriculated at Christ's College, Cambridge, in 1566. In 1570 he was elected fellow of Pembroke Hall. Here he formed a friendship with Edmund Spenser, who may have been his pupil.

Promotion of hexameter verse
Harvey wished to be "epitaphed as the Inventour of the English Hexameter," and was a prime mover in a literary clique known as the Areopagus which attempted to impose the Latin rules of quantity on English verse. In a letter to "M. Immerito" (Edmund Spenser) Harvey says that Edward Dyer and Philip Sidney were helping forward "our new famous enterprise for the exchanging of Barbarous and Balductum Rymes with Artificial Verses." The letter includes a tepid appreciation of Spenser's Faerie Queene which had been sent to him for his opinion, and he gives examples of English hexameters illustrative of the principles enunciated in the correspondence. The opening lines--"What might I call this Tree? A Laurell? O bonny Laurell Needes to thy bowes will I bow this knee, and vayle my bonetto"—afford a fair sample of the success of Harvey's metrical experiments, which were an easy mark for the wit of Thomas Nashe. "He (Harvey) goes twitching and hopping in our language like a man running upon quagmires, up the hill in one syllable, and down the dale in another," says Nashe in Strange Newes, and he mimics him in the mocking couplet:
"But ah ! what news do you hear of that good Gabriel Huff-Snuff, 
Known to the world for a fool, and clapped in the Fleet for a rhymer?"
Harvey influenced Spenser greatly for a short time, and the friendship lasted. Harvey is the "Hobbinoll" of his friend's The Shepheardes Calender, and into his mouth is put the beautiful song in the fourth eclogue in praise of Eliza. If he was really the author of the verses "To the Learned Shepheard," signed "Hobynoll" and prefixed to the Faerie Queene, he was a good poet spoiled. Harvey's genuine friendship for Spenser shows the best side of his character, which appeared uncompromising and quarrelsome to the world in general. In 1573 the bad feeling against him in his college was so strong that there was a delay of three months before the fellows would agree to grant him the necessary grace for his MA degree.

Career
He became reader in rhetoric in about 1576, and in 1578, on the occasion of Queen Elizabeth's visit to Sir Thomas Smith at Audley End House, he was appointed to dispute publicly before her. In the next year he wrote to Spenser complaining of the unauthorized publication of satirical verses of his which were supposed to reflect on high personages, and threatened seriously to injure his career. In 1583 he became junior proctor of Cambridge University,  and in 1585 was elected master of Trinity Hall, of which he had been a fellow from 1578, but the appointment appears to have been quashed at court. He was a protégé of Robert Dudley, Earl of Leicester, to whom he introduced Spenser, and this connection may account for his friendship with Sidney. But in spite of patronage, a second application for the mastership of Trinity Hall failed in 1598.

In 1585 he received the degree of D.C.L. from the University of Oxford, and is found practising at the bar in London. Gabriel's brother, Richard Harvey, had taken part in the Martin Marprelate controversy, and had given offence to Robert Greene by contemptuous references to him and his fellow wits. Greene retorted by inserting a few lines in the first edition of his A Quip for an Upstart Courtier containing scathing remarks on the four Harvey brothers, drawing attention, among other things, to the fact that they were the sons of a ropemaker. In 1599 Archbishop Whitgift made a raid on contemporary satire in general, and among other books the tracts of Harvey and Nashe were destroyed, and it was forbidden to reprint them. Harvey spent the last years of his life in retirement in Saffron Walden, dying there on 7 February 1631.

The Letter-Book of Gabriel Harvey, AD, 1573–80 (1884, ed. E J L Scott, Camden Society), contains rough drafts of the correspondence between Spenser and Harvey, letters relative to the disputes at Pembroke Hall, and an extraordinary correspondence dealing with the pursuit of his sister Mercy by a young nobleman. A copy of Quintilian (1542), in the British Museum, is extensively annotated by Harvey.

Harvey was also a wordsmith and has been credited with the coining or first use of the word "jovial" (derived from the Latin for "pertaining to Jove or Jupiter"), circa 1590, as well as the words "conscious", "extensively", "idiom", "notoriety" and "rascality". This claim is supported by the criticism of rival Thomas Nashe, in which Nashe cites Harvey as the creator of the words, announces his dislike of Harvey's words, and then predicts Mr. Harvey's words will not stand the test of time. Etymologist Robert Hendrickson also cites Harvey's hand in creating these words in his book The Facts on File Encyclopedia of Word and Phrase Origins.

Feud with Nashe
After Greene's death Harvey published Foure Letters and certaine Sonnets (1592), in which he revealed the miserable details of Greene's later years. Nashe settled his personal score with the Harveys, in Strange Newes (1593). Harvey rebutted the personal charges made by Nashe in Pierce's supererogation, or a New Prayse of the Old Asse (1593). In a religious work, Christs Teares over Jerusalem (1593) Nashe made a full apology to Harvey, who however resumed the controversy in a New Letter of Notable Contents (1593). Harvey probably had not seen Nashe's apology in print when he wrote the New Letter of Notable Contents, but he knew something along those lines was rumoured. He refused to take reports of Nashe's change of heart at face value until he had the proof in black and white:

"Till a public injury be publicly confessed, and print confuted in print, I am one of St. Thomas' disciples, not over prest to believe..."

This certainly sounds as if Harvey had simply not seen a copy of Christs Teares at the time of writing New Letter. Nashe dramatically withdrew his apology in a new edition (1595) of Christes Teares. Harvey, he claimed, had hinted at wanting a reconciliation so that Nashe would make a public apology, and as soon as he did so he was made to look a fool for his pains:

"Impious Gabriel Harvey, the vowed enemy to all vows and protestations, plucking on with a private slavish submission a general public reconciliation, hath with a cunning ambuscado of confiscated idle oaths, welnear betrayed me to infamy eternal (his own proper chair of torment in hell). I can say no more but the devil and he be no men of their words."

It was nearly two years before Nashe replied to New Letter. When hearing that Harvey had boasted of victory, he produced the most biting satire of the series in Have with You to Saffron-Walden (1596). Harvey never responded. Later Richard Lichfield of Cambridge attacked Nashe in The Trimming of Thomas Nashe Gentleman (1597). He signed his work "by the high-titled patron Don Richardo de Medico campo", a play on his name (i.e. "leech-field"). This work was formerly attributed to Harvey.

Editions and commentary
His complete works were edited by Grosart with a Memorial Introduction for the Huth Library (1884–1885). See also Isaac Disraeli, on "Literary Ridicule," in Calamities of Authors (ed. 1840); Thomas Warton's History of English Poetry (ed. William Hazlitt, 1871); John Payne Collier's Bibliographical and Critical Account of the Rarest Books in the English Language (1865), and the Works of Thomas Nashe. There is a modern edition of Harvey's pamphlets with Thomas Nashe prepared as a PhD thesis by Peter Brynmor Roberts at the University of Cardiff (2010). A number of Harvey's annotated books have been digitised as part of the 'Archaeology of Reading in Early Modern Europe' project.

Latin works
Ciceronianus (1577)
Gabrielis Harveii rhetor, vel duorum dierum oratio de natura, arte et exercitatione rhetorica (1577)
Smithus, vel Musarum lachrymae (1578), in honour of Sir Thomas Smith
Gabrielis Harveii gratulationum Valdensium libri quatuor, written on the occasion of the queen's visit to Audley End (1578)

Notes

References

  

Attribution

Further reading

External links
 
 

1550s births
1631 deaths
Alumni of Christ's College, Cambridge
Fellows of Pembroke College, Cambridge
16th-century scholars
16th-century English writers
16th-century male writers
17th-century English writers
17th-century English male writers
People educated at Saffron Walden Grammar School